Marina Aleksandrovna Kiskonen (born 19 March 1994) is a Russian football forward. She is playing for Russian Russian Women's Football Championship team CSKA Moscow.

During 2015–2018 Kiskonen played in the Russian Championship for Chertanovo Moscow, with which she also played in the UEFA Champions League. She scored 2nd most goals (8) in 2018 Russian Championship, and also found success in 2017 season with 5 goals.

Kiskonen also played for Kuopion Palloseura in Finland's Naisten Liiga, before signing for Spanish second division team Deportivo Alavés.

References

External links
Kiskonen profile page by the Russian FA
Kiskonen 2017 season video by Chertanovo
Kiskonen at UEFA U-19 Championships 2013 site

1994 births
Living people
Russian women's footballers
WFC Rossiyanka players
Women's association football forwards
Universiade medalists in football
Universiade bronze medalists for Russia
Russian people of Finnish descent
Russian Women's Football Championship players
UEFA Women's Euro 2017 players
21st-century Russian women